Jaffa is a 2013 Indian Telugu-language black comedy film written and directed by Vennela Kishore. The film stars comedian Brahmanandam as the main protagonist for the second time in his career. The films also stars other comedians like Ali, Thagubothu Ramesh, Fish Venkat and even Kishore. The film is produced by Ramesh Varma, with Anoop Rubens scoring the music. Brahmanandam was supposed to direct the film on a script written by Kishore, but eventually he opted out and handed the project to Kishore, due to hectic schedules. The film, one of the most awaited Telugu films in recent times, was originally scheduled to release in 2012, but after several delays, the film finally released on 29 March 2013 amidst high expectations.

Plot
The movie starts with Jasmine Falguna aka Jaffa (Brahmanandam), a former software engineer, narrating his story when he was in jail. He befriends all the prisoners in the jail, and subsequently becomes their leader. When prisoners face problems, Jaffa is the one who solves their problems. Eventually, he also befriends the jailor Nikki (Vennela Kishore). Nikki has been trying to get a terrorist in his custody to speak, but Nikki's tortures eventually lead to the terrorist hanging himself, putting Nikki in risk. Nikki pleads help from Jaffa, who is still in jail, for getting his job back. So Jaffa and Nikki together plan for Jaffa to escape from the jail. In the process, Father Suyodhana (Raghu Babu) is to be killed, and his corpse is to be placed in the coffin, and by the time the coffin is taken for burial, Jaffa will go inside the coffin. After the burial, Nikki will come to the graveyard to dig up the coffin and rescue Jaffa.

The movie moves to present day, where Jaffa is in the coffin. It is then revealed that, Nikki died when he tried to kill Father Suyodhana with poisoned milk, and ended up in the coffin. Jaffa, now trapped in the coffin has no one to help. Then he remembers that Nikki told him to call his friend Vishal if Nikki is not reachable. So Jaffa takes Nikki's phone to look for Vishal's number, only to turn the phone on and notice that the phone is configured to Hindi script, which Jaffa cannot read. Jaffa takes out Nikki's other phone, only to see that it has no battery. Jaffa now has only one option considering he can't read Hindi: Call every number on Nikki's phone.

Meanwhile, the police are searching for Jaffa, who is missing, and CBI Officer Katragadda (Ali) is on the mission to look for Jaffa. In order to get more information about Jaffa, Katragadda finds the three witnesses, who were prisoners in the same jail, but all three kill themselves before Katragadda is able to interrogate them. The rest of the story deals with whether Katragadda will catch Jaffa, and whether Jaffa will be rescued from the coffin.

Cast
Brahmanandam as Jasmine Falguna/Jaffa
Dhanaraj as Sujith
Vennela Kishore as Nikhil
Shankar Melkote as Melkoti, Jaffa's Boss
Ali as Detective Tapaswi Katragadda
Thagubothu Ramesh as Graveyard Caretaker
Fish Venkat as Fish Venkat, Police Informant
Saptagiri as Saptagiri, Prison Mate
Raghu Babu as Father Suyodhana
Venu Madhav as Alladdin
Ahuti Prasad
Giridhar as Giri, Prison Mate
Raghu Karumanchi as Prison Mate
Venu Tillu as Venu Bongula
Sravan
Harish Koyalagundla as Koyala
Chalaki Chanti

Reception 
The film received negative reviews from critics. 123Telugu rated the 1.5/5 and gave a verdict, "Jaffa ends up being a Jaffa film, like in other words, it is boring, slow and there is no rib-tickling comedy. In the past, Brahmanandam single handedly saved some films from being certain disasters. But sadly, even he cannot do anything here". Swathi of TeluguMirchi gave a rating of 1.75/5, saying that "Jaffa is a meaningless film, true to its title". GreatAndhra rated the film 1.5/5, and stated that "it sounds like a mad man's dream". The Deccan Chronicle said, "Overall, Bramhanandam's Jaffa is a disappointing film". Indiaglitz stated "Jaffa is strictly for the youth. If you are the kind who enjoys madcap humour which is logic-defying and grossly unsentimental, go for it with minimum expectations".

However, OneIndia gave a positive verdict that "Jaffa has no astounding story, but Vennele Kishore has created wonderful screenplay and has given good scope to every comedy actor to play their magic on you. The movie is a hilarious comedy". The film was mainly criticised for its direction, screenplay and its dragging story, nevertheless, Brahmanandam's performance was appreciated by most critics.

References

External links 
 

2013 films
Indian black comedy films
2010s Telugu-language films
2013 black comedy films